Frank Righeimer (February 28, 1909 – July 5, 1998) was an American fencer. He won two bronze medals at the 1932 Summer Olympics. He graduated from Yale University and Harvard Law School.

References

External links
 

1909 births
1998 deaths
American male épée fencers
Fencers at the 1932 Summer Olympics
Fencers at the 1936 Summer Olympics
Olympic bronze medalists for the United States in fencing
Sportspeople from Chicago
Medalists at the 1932 Summer Olympics
Yale Bulldogs rowers
Harvard Law School alumni
American male foil fencers
20th-century American people